Reinhilde Decleir (16 May 1948 – 6 April 2022) was a Flemish actress and director.

Career
In theater, Decleir played with the Blue Monday Company, the Toneelhuis and Theater Antigone in, among others, En deliver us from evil, In the name of the Father and the Son, Ten war and Nachtlied and directed, among others, Overleie, The Best of Shakespeare, Just of Faust and the Lice Opera. Decleir was a teacher at Studio Herman Teirlinck. In 2007, she founded Tutti Fratelli, a theater company for people who have fewer opportunities in society.

Decleir appeared in a number of Flemish films and TV series. In 2009, she had the lead role as Maria 'moemoe' Vangenechten in the television series Van Vlees en Bloed.

Personal life and death
Decleir was the youngest of five children, including her brothers actor Jan (1946) and Dirk Decleir (1942–1974). She had a son with actor Paul Wuyts (1948–2012).

Decleir died at the age of 73 as a result of euthanasia; at the time of her death, she had cancer.

References

External links 
 

1948 births
2022 deaths
People from Brasschaat
Flemish film actresses
Flemish stage actresses
Flemish television actresses
20th-century Belgian actresses
21st-century Belgian actresses
Deaths by euthanasia